Miracle is the sixth studio album by American rock band Nonpoint. The album's title track serves as its first single. This is the only Nonpoint album to feature guitarist Zach Broderick, who joined the band in late 2008 following the departure of original member Andrew Goldman, and the last to feature founding bassist Ken MacMillan. The album was recorded in Racine, WI and was produced by Mudvayne singer Chad Gray and guitarist Greg Tribbett.

The album debuted No. 59 on the Billboard 200 chart. Miracle is the second highest debut of the band's career. It also landed at No. 5 on the Rock Albums chart in its first week of release.

It was announced in February 2010, that the album was to be released on April 27, 2010; however, it was delayed and was announced on March 10, that the release date would be on May 4, 2010.

The album was released in Europe on June 14 via Powerage Records.

Track listing

Personnel 

Members
 Elias Soriano - lead vocals
 Robb Rivera - drums, percussion
 Ken Charman - bass, backing vocals
 Zach Broderick - guitars

Production
 Nonpoint – producer
 Chad Gray – producer
 Greg Tribbett – producer
 Chris Wisco  – engineer
 Jeremy Parker – mixing
 Dave McNair – mastering
 Phil Anselmo – additional songwriting
 Rex Brown – additional songwriting
 Vincent – additional songwriting
 Darrell Abbott – additional songwriting
 James Rochette – drum technician
 Brian Porizek – art direction, package design 
 Ty Watkins – band photo

References

 

2010 albums
Nonpoint albums